Pop It! was a Canadian exercise television series from 2007 for children ages 5–11. It is hosted by three dancers, Briana Andrade-Gomes, Shemar Charles and Lamar Johnson, who show and explain routines from their music videos.

The show was filmed at the IAOD studios in Toronto produced by Hop To It Productions, Inc., in association with TVO and the Bell Fund. There are 26 episodes, each of which is 7 minutes long. The show first aired on TVO on September 3, 2007. It also aired on SCN in Saskatchewan and Knowledge Network in British Columbia.

Staff
Hosts:
Briana Andrade-Gomes
Shemar Charles
Lamar Johnson

Awards and nominations

References

2007 Canadian television series debuts
2000s Canadian children's television series
TVO original programming
Dance television shows
Exercise television shows